Anders Beggerud (22 June 1894 in Sandsvær – 22 June 1957) was a Norwegian civil servant during the Nazi regime.

He hailed from Kongsberg, and was a crafts teacher by profession. He was a member of Nasjonal Samling. From 1940 to 1945, during the occupation of Norway by Nazi Germany, Beggerud served as director of the Norwegian Press Directorate, a subdivision of the Ministry of Culture and Enlightenment. He was sentenced to eight years of forced labor as a part of the legal purge in Norway after World War II.

References

1894 births
1957 deaths
People from Kongsberg
Members of Nasjonal Samling
People convicted of treason for Nazi Germany against Norway
Directors of government agencies of Norway